Georgi Semyonovich Lasin (5 February 1914 in St. Petersburg – 21 October 2004 in St. Petersburg) was a Soviet Russian football player and coach.

External links
 

1914 births
Footballers from Saint Petersburg
2004 deaths
Soviet footballers
FC Zenit Saint Petersburg players
Soviet football managers
FC Zenit Saint Petersburg managers
Soviet expatriate football managers
Expatriate football managers in China
Expatriate football managers in Afghanistan
Association football forwards